Mermaid's hair can refer to different genera of seaweed:

 Cladophora
 Desmarestia

See also
 Chorda filum, also known as 'mermaid tresses'
 Mermaid